Louis Engel (20 February 1885 – 3 October 1960) was a French racing cyclist. He rode in the 1919 Tour de France.

References

External links
 

1885 births
1960 deaths
French male cyclists
Place of birth missing